West Borneo Special Region was a component entity of the United States of Indonesia in western part of Borneo.  It was established on 12 May 1947 with capital at Pontianak.  West Borneo was dissolved on 22 April 1950 and became part of Kalimantan Province which was formed on 14 August 1950 with its capital at Banjarmasin.  Following the division of Kalimantan Province, the former territory of West Borneo was assigned to West Kalimantan in 1956 where it remains today.

Person of interests
 Syarif Hamid II of Pontianak

References

Indonesian National Revolution
States and territories established in 1947
States and territories disestablished in 1950